Natalie Chaidez is an American television writer and producer, known for Terminator: The Sarah Connor Chronicles, Hunters, and 12 Monkeys.

She's currently the showrunner for Queen of the South. More recently, Chaidez signed a multi-year overall deal with Warner Bros. Television.

Personal life
Born and raised in Los Angeles, Chaidez is a graduate of UCLA School of Theater, Film and Television. Her daughter, Chloe, is the lead singer of the indie rock band Kitten. She is of Mexican and Irish ancestry.

Filmography
Producer 
 Queen of the South (executive producer)
 Hunters (executive producer)
12 Monkeys (executive producer)
 Terminator: The Sarah Connor Chronicles (co-executive producer and consulting producer)
Heroes (co-executive producer)
 Skin (co-executive producer)
Trinity (producer)

References

External links 
 

American television producers
American women television producers
American television writers
American writers of Mexican descent
Living people
American women television writers
Year of birth missing (living people)
21st-century American women